The following radio stations broadcast on AM frequency 680 kHz: 680 AM is a North American clear-channel frequency. KNBR and KBRW share Class A status on 680 kHz. WRKO, WPTF, CJOB and CFTR also broadcast on 680 kHz, with 50,000 watts at all times, but are class B.

In Argentina 
 LT3 in Rosario, Santa Fe Province
 LU12 in Rio Gallegos, Santa Cruz
 LV6 in Mendoza

In Canada

In Mexico
 XECHG-AM in Chilpancingo, Guerrero

In the United States
Stations in bold are clear-channel stations.

References

Lists of radio stations by frequency